Nickelodeon Animation Studio is an American animation studio owned by Paramount Global. It has created many original television programs for Nickelodeon, such as SpongeBob SquarePants, The Fairly OddParents, Rugrats and Avatar: The Last Airbender, among various others. Since the 2010s, the studio has also produced its own series based on preexisting IP purchased by Paramount Global, such as Teenage Mutant Ninja Turtles and Winx Club. In November 2019, Nickelodeon Animation Studio signed a multiple-year output deal for Netflix, which will include producing content, in both new and preexisting IP, for the streaming platform.

The studio was founded in 1990, originally named Games Productions Inc. and later Games Animation. It oversaw the production of three animated programs for Nickelodeon: Doug, Rugrats, and The Ren & Stimpy Show. In 1992, Nickelodeon began work on Games Animation's first fully in-house series, Rocko's Modern Life. Games Animation produced much of the network's mid-1990s output in partnership with other animation companies like Klasky Csupo. In 1998, the studio moved from Studio City, California to Burbank with the construction of a new facility. It was renamed Nickelodeon Animation Studio and later Nickelodeon Studios Burbank. In 1999, a second facility in New York City was opened, named Nickelodeon Animation Studio New York.

History

1990–1998: As Games Animation 
The Nickelodeon Animation Studio's earliest beginnings lie in the roots of the channel's Nicktoons endeavor. In 1990, Nickelodeon hired Vanessa Coffey as a creative consultant to develop Nicktoons, charging her with the quest of seeking out new characters and stories that would allow the channel a grand entrance into the animation business. The high cost of high-quality animation discouraged the network from developing weekly animated programming. Although most television networks at the time tended to go to large animation houses with proven track records to develop Saturday-morning series, often generally pre-sold characters from movies, toys or comics, Nickelodeon desired differently. Inspired by the early days of animation and the work of Bob Clampett, Tex Avery and Chuck Jones, Nickelodeon set out to find frustrated cartoonists swallowed up by the studio system. Nickelodeon president Geraldine Laybourne commissioned eight six-minute pilots at a cost of $100,000 each before selecting three. Seeking the most innovative talents in the field, the products of this artists' union – Doug, Rugrats and The Ren & Stimpy Show – represented twelve years of budget-building toward that end. Coffey was hired as Nickelodeon's Executive Producer of Animation between the pilots and series production.

However, despite the best efforts, relations became strained with Ren & Stimpy creator John Kricfalusi. In fall 1992, the studio fired Kricfalusi. Coffey asserts that John was in breach of contract for not delivering on time, creating disturbing content and going over budget. Kricfalusi suspected the real reason was that the network was uncomfortable with more crude humor. Nickelodeon objected to most of his proposed plotlines and new characters—including George Liquor, an Archie Bunker-ish "All-American Male." After Kricfalusi and Nickelodeon missed several promised new-episode delivery and air dates, the network—which had purchased the rights to the Ren & Stimpy characters from Kricfalusi—negotiated a settlement with him. The creative tug of war was closely watched by both animators and the television industry and covered in the national press.

In response, Nickelodeon formed its own animation studio, Games Productions Inc. The name was later shortened to Games Animation. The series was moved to Games and put under the creative supervision of Bob Camp, one of Kricfalusi's former writer-director partners. Nick's plan was to hire bright, young animators and let them do almost anything they want. Coffey soon stepped down as animation vice president for Nickelodeon, to pursue her own projects. She was replaced by Mary Harrington, a Nickelodeon producer who moved out from New York to help run the Nicktoons division that was a near-shambles after Kricfalusi was fired.

In 1992, animator Joe Murray was approached by the studio with intentions of developing a new animated series for Games Animation. Murray's Joe Murray Productions and Games Animation rented office space on Ventura Boulevard in the Studio City neighborhood of the San Fernando Valley region of Los Angeles, California. The production moved to a different office building on Vineland Avenue in Studio City. Executives did not share space with the creative team. Games Animation's first in-house production, Rocko's Modern Life, premiered on the network in 1993.

The initial duty was to continue producing The Ren & Stimpy Show as Nickelodeon dropped Spümcø and its creator John Kricfalusi from their duties on the show. At the time, Games was located in an office building in Studio City, California. Apart from The Ren & Stimpy Show, Nickelodeon's other Nicktoons were done out-of-house at Jumbo Pictures (whose next deal with Nickelodeon would be a live-action/puppet series Allegra's Window for Nick Jr.) in New York City and Klasky-Csupo (who entered mainstream popularity as animation producers from Fox's longest-running animated sitcom The Simpsons from 1987 to 1992 when animation production duties were given to Film Roman, as well as Everett Peck's Duckman which was produced by Nickelodeon's sister company Paramount Television and aired on USA Network in 1994 through 1997).

In 1993, the studio greenlit its first fully original in-house series, Rocko's Modern Life, produced by Games Animation with the partnership of Joe Murray Studio. Games worked on the show for three years and employed over 70 people during the course of its run. The show was canceled in 1996 by Nickelodeon due to its creator Joe Murray wanting to spend more time with his family. Following the cancellation, Games Animation produced the pilots of Hey Arnold!, The Angry Beavers, and CatDog, along with the former's first 26 episodes, and the second's 13 episodes. The latter was produced by Nickelodeon Animation Studios along with the other two by this point forward.

1998–2009: As Nickelodeon Animation Studio 

In 1996, Albie Hecht, then-president of Film and TV Entertainment for Nickelodeon, met with Nickelodeon artists for a brainstorming session on the elements of their ideal studio, and, with their feedback (and some inspiration from the fabled Willy Wonka chocolate factory), created "a playful, inspirational and cutting-edge lab which will hopefully give birth to the next generation of cartoon classics." He added, "For me, this building is the physical manifestation of a personal dream, which is that when people think of cartoons, they'll say Nicktoons." Nickelodeon and parent company Viacom threw a bash to celebrate the opening of the new Nicktoons animation studio on March 4, 1998. During the launch party, a gathering of union labor supporters formed a picket line to protest Nickelodeon's independent hiring practices outside the studio's iron gates.

Located at 231 West Olive Avenue in Burbank, California, the  facility, designed by Los Angeles architecture firm AREA, houses 200–300 employees and up to five simultaneous productions. It also contains a miniature golf course (with a hole dedicated to Walt Disney), an indoor basketball course/screening room, an artists' gallery, a studio store, and a fountain that shoots green water into the air. The Nicktoons studio houses five, project driven production units. Each has its own color and design environment and includes a living room, writer's lounge, and storyboard conference room. The studio also has a Foley stage (for recording live sound effects), a post-production area, sound editing and mixing rooms and an upstairs loft area with skylights for colorists.

In September 1999, Nickelodeon opened a major new digital animation studio at 1633 Broadway in Manhattan. The New York studio primarily took over production of Nick Jr. animated properties. At the same time, the Los Angeles facility animated the intro for The Amanda Show.

It was reported in 2005 that the Burbank studio was up for sale; this was later corrected, as the owner of the building was selling it.

In mid-2006, Nickelodeon announced a collaboration with DreamWorks Animation to create shows based on DWA's films. The first DWA co-production was The Penguins of Madagascar, which would eventually premiere in November 2008 (followed by 2011's Kung Fu Panda: Legends of Awesomeness and 2013's Monsters vs. Aliens).

In 2007, Nick launched El Tigre: The Adventures of Manny Rivera (the first Nicktoon created in Adobe Flash) and Tak and the Power of Juju (based on the video game series of the same name). Back at the Barnyard (a spinoff of the theatrical film Barnyard) was released that same year.

2009–2019: Studio collaborations and acquisitions 
In 2009, Nickelodeon acquired the rights to Teenage Mutant Ninja Turtles from Mirage Studios. In early 2011, Viacom bought 30 percent of the Italian studio Rainbow SpA, the creators of Winx Club. Following both purchases, Nickelodeon Animation Studio began to produce new content for both franchises: a continuation of Winx Club and a reboot series of TMNT. Since they were produced by Nickelodeon Animation Studio, Nickelodeon refers to both continuations as official Nicktoons.

By 2013, Nickelodeon's deal with DreamWorks Animation had reached an end; according to Bob Schooley, Nickelodeon Animation expressed a desire to refocus on "more Nickish shows." Looking for original concepts, Nickelodeon Animation Studio created the Nickelodeon Animated Shorts Program, under which it would produce new animated shorts with the potential to turn into whole shows. A select few were greenlit and premiered within the following years.

In 2016, Nickelodeon's Burbank animation facility moved into a five-story glass structure that is part of a larger studio complex. The move was intended to bring animated productions currently produced elsewhere in Southern California under a single production facility. Because it houses both animated and live-action productions, the Burbank location has been renamed to simply "Nickelodeon Studios" (which is not to be confused with the original Nickelodeon Studios at Universal Studios Florida, which closed in 2005). The studio also houses the Nickelodeon time capsule, first buried in Orlando, Florida in 1992 at the original Nickelodeon Studios and later at the Nickelodeon Suites Resort in 2006, which has moved to the new studio by the latter's closure and rebrand on June 1, 2016. The capsule is set to be opened on April 30, 2042. The new studio opened on January 11, 2017.

2019–present: Expanding brands 
In October 2018, Brian Robbins became president of Nickelodeon. In November, he appointed Ramsey Ann Naito as head of animation at Nickelodeon; she was later promoted to president of Nickelodeon Animation Studio in 2020. In both roles, Naito reported to Robbins. Under Robbins' presidency, Nickelodeon began to focus more on expanding some its preexisting franchises. At Nickelodeon Animation Studio, this effort encompassed the first-ever SpongeBob spin-offs (Kamp Koral: SpongeBob's Under Years and The Patrick Star Show) and a CGI reboot of Rugrats. The studio also collaborated with corporate sibling CBS Eye Animation Productions to produce Star Trek: Prodigy.

Filmography

See also 

 List of animation studios owned by Paramount Global
 Nickelodeon Movies
 Paramount Animation – animation division of Paramount Global's film studio, Paramount Pictures
 MTV Animation – animation division of fellow Paramount Global's MTV Entertainment Studios
 CBS Eye Animation Productions – the animation division of CBS Studios
 Rainbow S.p.A. – Italian animation studio co-owned by Paramount Global from 2011 until 2023

Notes

References

External links 
 

Nickelodeon Animation Studio
American animation studios
American companies established in 1990
Entertainment companies established in 1990
Mass media companies established in 1990
1990 establishments in California
Companies based in Burbank, California
Nickelodeon
Animation studios owned by Paramount Global